Soseki  may refer to:
 Japanese novelist Natsume Sōseki
 Zen master, garden designer, and writer Musō Soseki